Geoff McGivern is the name of:

 Geoffrey McGivern (born 1952), English actor
 Geoff McGivern (footballer) (1930–2015), former Australian rules football player